Carbon steel is a steel with carbon content from about 0.05 up to 2.1 percent by weight. The definition of carbon steel from the American Iron and Steel Institute (AISI) states:

 no minimum content is specified or required for chromium, cobalt, molybdenum, nickel, niobium, titanium, tungsten, vanadium, zirconium, or any other element to be added to obtain a desired alloying effect;
 the specified minimum for copper does not exceed 0.40%;
 or the maximum content specified for any of the following elements does not exceed the percentages noted: manganese 1.65%; silicon 0.60%; copper 0.60%.

The term carbon steel may also be used in reference to steel which is not stainless steel; in this use carbon steel may include alloy steels. High carbon steel has many different uses such as milling machines, cutting tools (such as chisels) and high strength wires. These applications require a much finer microstructure, which improves the toughness.

Carbon steel is a popular metal choice for knife-making due to its high amount of carbon, giving the blade more edge retention. To make the most out of this type of steel it is very important to heat treat it properly. If not, the knife may end up being brittle, or too soft to hold an edge.

As the carbon percentage content rises, steel has the ability to become harder and stronger through heat treating; however, it becomes less ductile. Regardless of the heat treatment, a higher carbon content reduces weldability. In carbon steels, the higher carbon content lowers the melting point.

Type

Mild or low-carbon steel
Mild steel (iron containing a small percentage of carbon, strong and tough but not readily tempered), also known as plain-carbon steel and low-carbon steel, is now the most common form of steel because its price is relatively low while it provides material properties that are acceptable for many applications. Mild steel contains approximately 0.05–0.30% carbon making it malleable and ductile. Mild steel has a relatively low tensile strength, but it is cheap and easy to form. Surface hardness can be increased with carburization.

In applications where large cross-sections are used to minimize deflection, failure by yield is not a risk so low-carbon steels are the best choice, for example as structural steel.

Low-carbon steels display yield-point runout where the material has two yield points. The first yield point (or upper yield point) is higher than the second and the yield drops dramatically after the upper yield point. If a low-carbon steel is only stressed to some point between the upper and lower yield point then the surface develops Lüder bands. Low-carbon steels contain less carbon than other steels and are easier to cold-form, making them easier to handle. Typical applications of low carbon steel are car parts, pipes, construction, and food cans.

High-tensile steel 
High-tensile steels are low-carbon, or steels at the lower end of the medium-carbon range, which have additional alloying ingredients in order to increase their strength, wear properties or specifically tensile strength. These alloying ingredients include chromium, molybdenum, silicon, manganese, nickel, and vanadium. Impurities such as phosphorus and sulfur have their maximum allowable content restricted.

 41xx steel
 4140 steel
 4145 steel
 4340 steel
 300M steel
 EN25 steel – 2.521% nickel-chromium-molybdenum steel
 EN26 steel

Higher-carbon steels
Carbon steels which can successfully undergo heat-treatment have a carbon content in the range of 0.30–1.70% by weight. Trace impurities of various other elements can significantly affect the quality of the resulting steel. Trace amounts of sulfur in particular make the steel red-short, that is, brittle and crumbly at working temperatures. Manganese is often added to improve the hardenability of low-carbon steels. These additions turn the material into a low-alloy steel by some definitions, but AISI's definition of carbon steel allows up to 1.65% manganese by weight.
There are two types of higher carbon steels which are high carbon steel and the ultra high carbon steel. The reason for the limited use of high carbon steel is that it has extremely poor ductility and weldability and has a higher cost of production. the applications best suited for the high carbon steels is its use in the spring industry, farm industry, and in the production of wide range of high-strength wires.

AISI classification

Carbon steel is broken down into four classes based on carbon content:

Low-carbon steel
0.05 to 0.15% carbon (plain carbon steel) content.

Medium-carbon steel
Approximately 0.3–0.5% carbon content. Balances ductility and strength and has good wear resistance; used for large parts, forging and automotive components.

High-carbon steel 
Approximately 0.6 to 1.0% carbon content. Very strong, used for springs, edged tools, and high-strength wires.

Ultra-high-carbon steel
Approximately 1.25–2.0% carbon content. Steels that can be tempered to great hardness. Used for special purposes like (non-industrial-purpose) knives, axles, and punches. Most steels with more than 2.5% carbon content are made using powder metallurgy.

Heat treatment

The purpose of heat treating carbon steel is to change the mechanical properties of steel, usually ductility, hardness, yield strength, or impact resistance. Note that the electrical and thermal conductivity are only slightly altered. As with most strengthening techniques for steel, Young's modulus (elasticity) is unaffected. All treatments of steel trade ductility for increased strength and vice versa. Iron has a higher solubility for carbon in the austenite phase; therefore all heat treatments, except spheroidizing and process annealing, start by heating the steel to a temperature at which the austenitic phase can exist. The steel is then quenched (heat drawn out) at a moderate to low rate allowing carbon to diffuse out of the austenite forming iron-carbide (cementite) and leaving ferrite, or at a high rate, trapping the carbon within the iron thus forming martensite. The rate at which the steel is cooled through the eutectoid temperature (about ) affects the rate at which carbon diffuses out of austenite and forms cementite. Generally speaking, cooling swiftly will leave iron carbide finely dispersed and produce a fine grained pearlite and cooling slowly will give a coarser pearlite. Cooling a hypoeutectoid steel (less than 0.77 wt% C) results in a lamellar-pearlitic structure of iron carbide layers with α-ferrite (nearly pure iron) between. If it is hypereutectoid steel (more than 0.77 wt% C) then the structure is full pearlite with small grains (larger than the pearlite lamella) of cementite formed on the grain boundaries. A eutectoid steel (0.77% carbon) will have a pearlite structure throughout the grains with no cementite at the boundaries. The relative amounts of constituents are found using the lever rule. The following is a list of the types of heat treatments possible:

Spheroidite can form at lower temperatures but the time needed drastically increases, as this is a diffusion-controlled process. The result is a structure of rods or spheres of cementite within primary structure (ferrite or pearlite, depending on which side of the eutectoid you are on). The purpose is to soften higher carbon steels and allow more formability. This is the softest and most ductile form of steel.
The steel must then be cooled slowly, in the realm of 20°C (36°F) per hour. Usually it is just furnace cooled, where the furnace is turned off with the steel still inside. This results in a coarse pearlitic structure, which means the "bands" of pearlite are thick. Fully annealed steel is soft and ductile, with no internal stresses, which is often necessary for cost-effective forming. Only spheroidized steel is softer and more ductile.
The image rightward shows the process annealing area.
 Isothermal annealing It is a process in which hypoeutectoid steel is heated above the upper critical temperature. This temperature is maintained for a time and then reduced to below the lower critical temperature and is again maintained. It is then cooled to room temperature. This method eliminates any temperature gradient.
This results in a fine pearlitic structure, and a more-uniform structure. Normalized steel has a higher strength than annealed steel; it has a relatively high strength and hardness.
 Quenching Carbon steel with at least 0.4 wt% C is heated to normalizing temperatures and then rapidly cooled (quenched) in water, brine, or oil to the critical temperature. The critical temperature is dependent on the carbon content, but as a general rule is lower as the carbon content increases. This results in a martensitic structure; a form of steel that possesses a super-saturated carbon content in a deformed body-centered cubic (BCC) crystalline structure, properly termed body-centered tetragonal (BCT), with much internal stress. Thus quenched steel is extremely hard but brittle, usually too brittle for practical purposes. These internal stresses may cause stress cracks on the surface. Quenched steel is approximately three times harder (four with more carbon) than normalized steel.
 Martempering (marquenching) Martempering is not actually a tempering procedure, hence the term marquenching. It is a form of isothermal heat treatment applied after an initial quench, typically in a molten salt bath, at a temperature just above the "martensite start temperature". At this temperature, residual stresses within the material are relieved and some bainite may be formed from the retained austenite which did not have time to transform into anything else. In industry, this is a process used to control the ductility and hardness of a material. With longer marquenching, the ductility increases with a minimal loss in strength; the steel is held in this solution until the inner and outer temperatures of the part equalize. Then the steel is cooled at a moderate speed to keep the temperature gradient minimal. Not only does this process reduce internal stresses and stress cracks, but it also increases impact resistance.
 Tempering This is the most common heat treatment encountered because the final properties can be precisely determined by the temperature and time of the tempering. Tempering involves reheating quenched steel to a temperature below the eutectoid temperature and then cooling. The elevated temperature allows very small amounts spheroidite to form, which restores ductility but reduces hardness. Actual temperatures and times are carefully chosen for each composition.
The resulting steel, called bainite, produces an acicular microstructure in the steel that has great strength (but less than martensite), greater ductility, higher impact resistance, and less distortion than martensite steel. The disadvantage of austempering is it can be used only on a few sheets of steel, and it requires a special salt bath.

Case hardening

Case hardening processes harden only the exterior of the steel part, creating a hard, wear-resistant skin (the "case") but preserving a tough and ductile interior. Carbon steels are not very hardenable meaning they can not be hardened throughout thick sections. Alloy steels have a better hardenability, so they can be through-hardened and do not require case hardening. This property of carbon steel can be beneficial, because it gives the surface good wear characteristics but leaves the core flexible and shock-absorbing.

Forging temperature of steel

See also

Aermet
Cold working
Eglin steel (a low-cost precipitation-hardened high-strength steel)
Forging
Hot working
Maraging steel (precipitation-hardened high-strength steels)
Welding (high-strength steels)

References

Bibliography

Steels
Metallurgical processes